TCB-2 is a hallucinogen discovered in 2006 by Thomas McLean working in the lab of David Nichols at Purdue University. It is a conformationally-restricted derivative of the phenethylamine 2C-B, also a hallucinogen, and acts as a potent agonist for the 5-HT2A and 5-HT2C receptors with a Ki of 0.26 nM at the human 5-HT2A receptor. In drug-substitution experiments in rats, TCB-2 was found to be of similar potency to both LSD and Bromo-DragonFLY, ranking it among the most potent phenethylamine hallucinogens yet discovered. This high potency and selectivity has made TCB-2 useful for distinguishing 5-HT2A mediated responses from those produced by other similar receptors. TCB-2 has similar but not identical effects in animals to related phenethylamine hallucinogens such as DOI, and has been used for studying how the function of the 5-HT2A receptor differs from that of other serotonin receptors in a number of animal models, such as studies of cocaine addiction and neuropathic pain.

See also 
 β-Methyl-2C-B
 2CB-Ind
 2CBCB-NBOMe
 Ivabradine
 Jimscaline
 S33005
 ZC-B

References 

Psychedelic phenethylamines
Bromoarenes
Phenol ethers
Benzocyclobutenes
5-HT2A agonists
5-HT2C agonists